Wen Li-hsiu (born 11 November 1982) is a Taiwanese softball player. She competed for Chinese Taipei at the 2008 Summer Olympics.

References

Living people
1982 births
Olympic softball players of Taiwan
Taiwanese softball players
Softball players at the 2008 Summer Olympics
Asian Games medalists in softball
Softball players
Softball players at the 2006 Asian Games
Medalists at the 2006 Asian Games
Asian Games silver medalists for Chinese Taipei